Peter Kees Bol (born 1948) is an American historian and sinologist. He is the Charles H. Carswell Professor of East Asian Languages and Civilizations of Harvard University. Since 2013, he has been a Vice Provost of Harvard with oversight of HarvardX and the Harvard Initiative in Learning and Teaching (HILT). He is the founding director of the Harvard Center for Geographic Analysis, and also directs the China Historical Geographic Information System (CHGIS) and the China Biographical Database (CBDB) project.

Biography
Peter Bol earned his Ph.D. in Chinese history from Princeton University in 1980. His main research focus is China's cultural elites during the Tang, Song, Yuan, and Ming dynasties (from the 7th to the 17th century). He and William C. Kirby together teach ChinaX, a Harvard massive open online course (MOOC) with a worldwide enrollment of more than 45,000 students.

Bol has been a Vice Provost of Harvard University since 2013. He oversees HarvardX (open online learning) and the Harvard Initiative in Learning and Teaching (HILT). He is the founding director of the Harvard Center for Geographic Analysis, and also directs the China Historical Geographic Information System (in collaboration with Fudan University in Shanghai), and the China Biographical Database project (in collaboration with Academia Sinica in Taiwan and Peking University).

Selected publications
with Kidder Smith Jr., Joseph A. Adler, and Don J. Wyatt, Sung Dynasty Uses of the I-ching. . Princeton University Press. 1990, 2014, 2016.
This Culture of Ours: Intellectual Transitions in T'ang and Sung China. . Stanford University Press. 1992.
coeditor with Pauline Yu, Stephen Owen, and Willard Peterson, Ways with Words: Writing about Reading Texts from Early China. . University of California Press. 2000.
Neo-Confucianism in History. . Harvard University Press. 2010.

References

1948 births
Living people
American sinologists
Historians of China
Harvard University faculty
Princeton University alumni
20th-century American historians
American male non-fiction writers
21st-century American historians
21st-century American male writers
20th-century American male writers